African-American New Yorkers are residents of the U.S. state of New York who are of African American ancestry. As of the 2020 U.S. Census, African-Americans were 17.6% of the state's population. New York has the third largest African American population of any state in the United States, after Texas and Georgia. Black people were brought to the state during the slave trade when New York was a Dutch colony.

See also

 African Americans in New York City
 History of slavery in New York (state)
 Demographics of New York (state)
 List of African-American newspapers in New York

References

External links
The African American Presence in New York State History: Four Regional History Surveys : with a Selected List of African American Historic Sites for Each Region
History of Slavery in New York
The Forgotten History of Slavery in New York
African Presence in New York